Nicolas Petit (born 29 December 1978 in Paris, France) is a French Belgian academic specializing in competition policy, economic regulation, law and technology. He is Joint Chair in Competition Law at the European University Institute, Florence, Italy, in the Department of Law and at the Robert Schuman Center for Advanced Studies.

Career 
Petit studied law at University of Paris Descartes (Paris V) and the University of Paris II Pathéon-Assas before receiving his LL.M from the College of Europe. He completed his PhD in law at the University of Liege in 2007.

Petit has been full professor at the Law School of the University of Liege and part-time/panel judge of the Belgian Competition Authority. He was also an Associate at Howrey LLP, Brussels and Clerk at the Commercial Chamber of the French Supreme Court. He became a member of Harvard Law School’s Visiting Researcher Programme in 2005 and was a visiting fellow at Stanford University Hoover Institution.

In 2017 the Global Competition Review (GCR) awarded him for "academic excellence". 

In 2013 he was awarded the prize for the best law book at the French Supreme Court, moreover several of his papers have been cited officially in court.

In 2020, Petit joined the European University Institute as Joint Chair in Competition Law and professor at the European University Institute’s Robert Schuman Center for Advanced Studies (RSCAS). He is also a visiting professor at the College of Europe in Bruges.

From 2018 to 2020, Petit has been a member of the European Commission High Level Expert Group on Artificial Intelligence.

In 2020, he published a book on big tech companies in which he coined the term "moligopoly". The book suggests substantial levels of broad-based competition amongst some big tech firms inconsistent with findings of monopoly behavior. In her review, economist Diane Coyle wrote that the book is a "useful warning that we should think carefully and in detail about what harms we believe Big Tech is causing", and that it is "a distinctive corrective against the current tendency toward groupthink on this subject". Petit predicted emerging competitive tendencies in the tech world distinct from the early perceptions used in the policymaking structure to advance law and regulatory reform towards digital platforms.

Petit is the founder of the specialist blog Chillin'Competition and of the Brussels School of Competition, and organization which develops educational programs in competition law and economics as well as artificial intelligence policy.

Selected publications 

 B ig Tech and the Digital Economy: The Moligopoly Scenario, Oxford: Oxford University Press, 2020 
 "Innovation Competition, Unilateral Effects and Merger Policy", Antitrust Law Journal, 2019, Vol. 82, No. 3, pp. 876–77  
 "The Misguided Assault on the Consumer Welfare Standard in the Age of Platform Markets", Review of Industrial Organization, 2019, Vol. 54, No. 4, pp. 741–774 
 Auer, D.and Petit, N., "Two-Sided Markets and the Challenge of Turning Economic Theory into Antitrust Policy", Antitrust Bulletin, 2015, Vol. 60, No. 4
 Petit, N., "The Oligopoly Problem in EU Competition Law" (February 5, 2012) in Research Handbook in European Competition Law, I. Liannos and D. Geradin eds., Edward Elgar, 2013
 Damien, G., Layne-Farrar, A., and Petit, N., EU Competition Law and Economics, Oxford: Oxford University Press, 2012
 ''Droit européen de la concurrence'', Paris: Librairie générale de droit et de jurisprudence, 2013, 2018 and 2020 (Winner of French Constitutional Council's Best Law Book of the Year)

References 

French academics
Academic staff of the University of Liège
College of Europe alumni
Academic staff of the European University Institute
Competition law
Living people
1978 births